Food 911 is a 30-minute-long show hosted by Tyler Florence that has aired on the Food Network since 1999.

The premise of the show involves Florence traveling across the United States to help individuals overcome various cooking dilemmas in their homes. A typical show involves three different dishes.

Participation in solving the problem varies by show, but Florence defers credit to his host regardless.

Food Network original programming
2000s American cooking television series
2000 American television series debuts
2006 American television series endings